Oroperipatus lankesteri is a species of velvet worm in the Peripatidae family. This species is brownish grey and is notable for its large size, which ranges from 32 mm up to 82 mm in length. Females of this species have 37 or 38 pairs of legs; males have 33 to 35 pairs. Like other neotropical peripatid velvet worms, this species is viviparous, with mothers supplying nourishment to their embryos through a placenta. The type locality is in Ecuador.

References

Onychophorans of tropical America
Onychophoran species
Animals described in 1899